The Bell 212A modulation scheme defined a standard method of transmitting full-duplex asynchronous serial data at 1.2 kbit/s over analogue transmission lines.  The equivalent, but incompatible ITU-T standard is V.22.

Device
The Bell 212 Dataset is a 1979-vintage modem used for communicating over telephone lines at 300 or 1200 bits per second. The 212A standard provides for the ability of a modem to auto-answer a ringing phone.

Usage
The Bell 212A scheme was the most common standard used for 1200 bps transmission on US data networks such as CompuServe during the period that dial-up Internet access was the norm (1980s and 1990s).

See also
List of device bandwidths

References

Data transmission

Telecommunications-related introductions in 1979